Michalos is a surname. Notable people with the surname include:

Alex Michalos (born 1935), Canadian political scientist
Nikos Michalos (born 1977), Greek basketball player
Takis Michalos (1947–2010), Greek water polo player

Greek-language surnames
Surnames